JDA may refer to:

JDA Software, an American software and consultancy company
JDA Dijon Basket or Jeanne d'Arc Dijon Basket, a French basketball club
JDA Dijon Handball or Jeanne d'Arc Dijon Handball, a French handball club
Janne Da Arc, a Japanese rock group
Japan Defense Agency, the former name of the Japanese Ministry of Defense
Japan Dental Association
Jersey Democratic Alliance
Jerusalem Declaration on Antisemitism
Jerusalem Development Authority
Grant County Regional Airport (IATA code) in John Day, Oregon
Joint defense agreement, an extension of attorney-client privilege